Jonathan Alexander Prince (born August 16, 1958) is an American actor, director, screenwriter and movie producer.

Career
Prince embarked on an acting career following graduation from Harvard University. His played Leo in the 1981 CBS series Mr. Merlin, Roy in the 1983 sex comedy Private School and Zach Armstrong in the 1986 syndicated sitcom Throb. He also hosted The Quiz Kids Challenge in 1990. Prince said he decided to expand into other aspects of show business while working on Mr. Merlin. Prince's next break came when George Burns asked him to co-write and produce Burns' feature film 18 Again!. That led to a job as consultant on the Whatever Became of...? television specials, where Prince met Dick Clark.

The meeting with Dick Clark led to the creation of American Dreams, set in the period 1963–1967 and tracking the lives of one Catholic family. Clark's American Bandstand is a key part of the story, as each episode incorporates musical performances from the show. Prince is listed as the creator, though he worked with Josh Goldstein to develop it, and Clark is listed as an executive producer.

Personal life
Prince was born in Beverly Hills, California, the son of Gayle Schlanger Prince, a special education teacher, and Martin Harry Prince, an optometrist. He graduated from Beverly Hills High in 1976. Prince is Jewish.

On June 17, 1995, Prince married actress Julie Warner. They have one son, Jackson, born in 1997. He and Warner divorced in 2010.

References

External links
 
 
 Jonathan Prince interview on American Dreams

1958 births
Living people
American male film actors
American game show hosts
American male television actors
Harvard University alumni
Jewish American male actors
Male actors from Beverly Hills, California
20th-century American male actors
21st-century American Jews